The Singing City (German: Die singende Stadt) is a 1930 German musical film directed by Carmine Gallone and starring Jan Kiepura, Brigitte Helm and Walter Janssen.

The film's sets were designed by the art director Oscar Werndorff.

An English-language version of the film, City of Song, also directed by Gallone and starring Kiepura along with a British cast, was released in 1931.

Synopsis
While holidaying in Naples, a wealthy young Austrian woman discovers the singing talents of her tour guide. He falls in love with her, but once she has taken him to Vienna to launch his career he becomes disillusioned with her lifestyle and circles of friends and returns home to Italy and his original girlfriend.

Cast
 Jan Kiepura as Giovanni Cavallone - Fremdenführer  
 Brigitte Helm as Claire Landshoff - junge Witwe  
 Walter Janssen as Professor Andreas Breuling  
 Trude Berliner as Carmela - neapolitanisches Mädchen  
 Georg Alexander as Rudi Feldegger  
 Franz Maldacea as Tupf - Carmelas Bruder  
 Käte Bill as Susanne - Claires Zofe  
 Henry Bender as Herr Maier aus Berlin  
 Hermann Blaß as Der Empfangschef  
 Teddy Bill as Heini Ladenburg / Claires Verehrer  
 Carl Goetz as Der Nachtportier  
 Martin Kosleck as Bobby Bertling - Claires Verehrer  
 Carol Ress as Marthe - Claires Zofe 
 Charlie Roellinghoff as Poldi Falkner - Claires Verehrer  
 Ernõ Szenes as Siegmund Königsberger - ein Konzertagent  
 C.H. Todd as Mr. Parkins aus London 
 Hans Heinrich von Twardowski as Willi von Wellheim - Claires Verehrer

References

Bibliography 
 Bock, Hans-Michael & Bergfelder, Tim. The Concise CineGraph. Encyclopedia of German Cinema. Berghahn Books, 2009.

External links 
 

1930 films
1930 musical films
Films of the Weimar Republic
German musical films
1930s German-language films
Films directed by Carmine Gallone
Films set in Naples
Films shot in Naples
Films set in Vienna
German multilingual films
German black-and-white films
Films with screenplays by Hans Székely
Films scored by Paul Abraham
Cine-Allianz films
UFA GmbH films
1930 multilingual films
1930s German films